Carly Gullickson and Laura Granville were the defending champions, but decided not to participate this year.

Christina Fusano and Raquel Kops-Jones won the title, defeating Stéphanie Dubois and Renata Voráčová 6–2, 7–6(8–6) in the final.

Seeds

Draw

References
Main Draw

Challenge Bell
Tournoi de Québec
Can